Teeth 'n' Smiles is a musical play written by David Hare.

Performances

The play was first performed at the Royal Court Theatre on 2 September 1975.

It was subsequently revived at Wyndhams Theatre in May 1976 (directed by the playwright), at the Oxford Playhouse in October 1977 and at the Crucible Theatre in 2002.

Dramatis Personae and Casts

1975 cast.
1976 cast.
1977 cast.

In a 1979 production in the USA, Maggie was played by Ellen Greene.

Plot

The play is set around the performances of a failing rock band fronted by lead singer Maggie Frisby at the May Ball on the night of 9 June 1969 at Jesus College, Cambridge.

Music

The songs in the play were written by Nick Bicât (music) and Tony Bicât (lyrics) and were -

 Close To Me
 Passing Through
 Yeah Yeah Yeah
 Bastards
 Let's Have A Party
 Arthur's Song
 Last Orders

Trivia

During the initial run at the Royal Court, Keith Moon turned up drunk at the stage door, joined Helen Mirren in her dressing room and told her how great the show was, and then tried to join the cast on stage before being stopped by the management.

Helen Mirren's interpretation of Maggie was based on Janis Joplin. She said of the role at the time: “I’m very like Maggie in many ways, only she’s much more ballsy and gutsy than me. I endorse most of what Maggie says, in fact in many ways it’s difficult to talk about her because I feel so close to her.”

External links
Review of Teeth 'n' Smiles 1975/6
Interview with Helen Mirren
Review of Teeth 'n' Smiles 2002

References

1975 plays
Plays by David Hare